Zelenbaba is a Serbian surname, derived from a nickname (zeleno, "green", baba, "grandmother"), traditionally found in the area of Knin (in Croatia).

Vladimir Zelenbaba (born 1982), Serbian footballer
Dušan Zelenbaba (born 1952), war-time Croatian Serb politician

Serbian surnames